Cressa or Kressa was a city of ancient Paphlagonia. According to Greek mythology, it was founded by Meriones after the Trojan War. It was taken by Ziaelas of Bithynia.

Its site is unlocated.

References

Populated places in ancient Paphlagonia
Former populated places in Turkey
Lost ancient cities and towns
Locations in Greek mythology